The Very Thought of You is an album by Canadian jazz singer Emilie-Claire Barlow. It was released in 2007 and nominated for Vocal Jazz Album of the Year at the Juno Awards of 2008.

Track listing

Personnel
 Emilie-Claire Barlow – vocal, shaker, triangle
 Kevin Turcotte – flugelhorn
 Kelly Jefferson – tenor saxophone
 Mike Murley – tenor saxophone
 Bill McBirnie – flute
 Nancy Walker – piano
 Reg Schwager – guitar
 Kieran Overs – bass guitar
 Mark Kelso – drums
 Alan Hetherington – percussion
 Drew Jurecka – violin
 Lenny Solomon – violin
 Kathryn Sugden – violin
 Rebecca van der Post – violin
 Rebekah Wolkstein – violin
 Anna Redekop – viola
 Claudio Vena – viola
 Alex Grant – cello
 Wendy Solomon – cello

References

2007 albums
Emilie-Claire Barlow albums